Eugen Gorceac (born 10 March 1987) is a retired Moldovan professional footballer who last plays for FC Costuleni.

External links
 

1987 births
Living people
Moldovan footballers
Moldova international footballers
FC Dacia Chișinău players
FC Zimbru Chișinău players
Association football midfielders